Frederick Slocum (February 6, 1873 – December 4, 1944) was an American astronomer. He was the director of Van Vleck Observatory.

Biography 
He was born in Fairhaven, Massachusetts to Frederick and Lydia Ann Jones Slocum. His father was a whaling ship captain, and Frederick spent much of his youth mastering boat handling. He enrolled at Brown University in 1891, and was awarded his A.B. in 1895 and a Ph.D. in 1898. He joined the staff of Brown University as a mathematics instructor, then became an assistant professor of astronomy in 1900 under the influence of Professor Winslow Upton at Ladd Observatory. Frederick Slocum took a leave of absence 1908–9 to study at the Royal Astronomical Observatory in Potsdam, Germany. He joined Yerkes Observatory in 1909 as an assistant, and remained there until 1911. He assisted Samuel A. Mitchell in research with parallax measurement techniques, and these were published in 1913.

In 1914 he became the first professor of astronomy at Wesleyan University, where he planned and supervised the construction of the Van Vleck Observatory. He became director of the observatory in 1915, and held this post until 1944. During World War I, he was absent while training merchant captains in the skill of navigation at the United States Shipping Board. He also spent some time at Brown University as professor in charge of the Department of Naval Science, before returning. He retired from Wesleyan in failing health on November 1, 1944.

He was a member of the American Astronomical Society and would join the Committee on Stellar Parallaxes. Their work would eventually result in the "Yale Parallax Catalogue". He served as a vice president of the society from 1935–37. In 1934 he served as Vice-President of Section D in the American Association for the Advancement of Science.

He married Carrie E. Tripp in 1899, and the couple remained together until her death in 1942. Slocum died in 1944 at the age of 71. He was survived by his brother, Edward M. Slocum. Edward's daughter Lois Tripp Slocum (1899-1951) was also an astronomer.

Published works

Awards and honors 
 Awarded an honorary doctorate of science from Brown in 1938.
 Elected fellow of the Royal Astronomical Society of London, England,  on November 10, 1911.
 Member of the Société Astronomique de France and the Astronomische Gesellschaft.
 Member of the National Research Council, 1934–37.
 The crater Slocum on the Moon is named after him.

References

External links 
 
 F. Slocum @ Astrophysics Data System

1873 births
1944 deaths
Brown University alumni
Wesleyan University faculty
American astronomers
People from Fairhaven, Massachusetts